Queens Land is a theme park in Poonamallee, Chennai, India, covering 70 acres (28 hectares). It opened in August 2003.

General information 
The park is located by the Chennai-Bangalore Trunk Road between Sriperumpudhur and Poonamalle. There is parking for cars. Buses are available from Guindy and T. Nagar. All buses going to Sriperumpudhur from Chennai stop at Queens Land.

Rides 

There are 51 rides, 33 for adults and 18 for children. A child may go on some adult rides if accompanied by an adult. The rides include: Free Fall Tower, and Super waves.
There are some water rides, which operate during afternoon hours. There are also separate swimming pools for women. They offer variety of dry and wet rides for their customers.

It's one of the most exciting spot for youth to spend time with their friends and family.

Incidents 
The park was closed for few weeks in 2008 due to a collision that resulted in the death of an 11-year-old girl while she was riding in a water boat in the lake. Seven employees were arrested in connection with the death.

On 18 June 2019, 12 people were injured when the cables holding the right platform of the free fall tower snapped while the ride was descending, causing the riders to plunge  to the ground. First aid was administered and no serious injuries were sustained. Following the incident, the park has been ordered to close indefinitely due to ride safety concerns.

See also 
 MGM Dizzee World, Chennai
 VGP Universal Kingdom, Chennai
 Dash n Splash, water park in Chennai
 Kishkinta, Chennai
 Black Thunder, Coimbatore
 Kovai Kondattam, Coimbatore
 Athisayam, Madurai

References

External links 

 
 Queensland Theme Park Chennai

Amusement parks in Chennai
2003 establishments in Tamil Nadu
Amusement parks opened in 2003